The Cape Messenger, also known as The Messenger, was a South African daily online newspaper founded in 2015 by Denis Worrall and edited by Donwald Pressly and published by The Messenger Media Innovation Group.  The publication focused on business and politics in South Africa with a particular focus on the Western Cape region of South Africa.  It become defunct in 2018.

References 

2015 establishments in South Africa
Daily newspapers published in South Africa
South African news websites
African news websites
Publications established in 2009
Mass media in Cape Town